Edward G. Janeway (August 25, 1901 – January 10, 1986) was a Vermont politician who served as President of the Vermont State Senate.

Biography
The son of Theodore Caldwell Janeway and Eleanor Caroline (Alderson) and brother of Charles Alderson Janeway, Edward Gamaliel Janeway was born in New Rochelle, New York on August 25, 1901.  He graduated from Yale University in 1922 and became an investment banker with White Weld & Co. in New York City.

Janeway served in the Navy during World War II, attaining the rank of lieutenant commander.  In 1945 he moved to South Londonderry, Vermont, where he was a dairy farmer and cattle breeder.  He was also active in several businesses, including serving on the board of directors of the Catamount National Bank and the Stratton Corporation.  He was also involved in several civic projects, including holding the office of President of the Calvin Coolidge Memorial Foundation.

He served in several local offices, including town meeting moderator and school board member.

A Republican, Janeway served in the Vermont House of Representatives from 1951 to 1957.

Janeway served as a member of the Republican National Committee from 1952 to 1972.

In 1958 Janeway was elected to the Vermont Senate.  He served 10 terms, 1959 to 1979, and was Senate President from 1969 to 1975.

Janeway died in Hanover, New Hampshire on January 10, 1986.  He was buried at Middletown Cemetery in Londonderry, Vermont.

Family
Janeway was married to Elinor White, whose family was involved in founding the White Weld investment company.

References

External links

1901 births
1986 deaths
Politicians from New Rochelle, New York
People from Windham County, Vermont
United States Navy personnel of World War II
Yale University alumni
Republican Party members of the Vermont House of Representatives
Republican Party Vermont state senators
Presidents pro tempore of the Vermont Senate
20th-century American politicians
United States Navy officers